West Midlands may refer to:

 West Midlands (region), a region of the United Kingdom
West Midlands (county), the metropolitan county in the West Midlands region
 West Midlands conurbation, the large conurbation in the West Midlands region
 West Midlands (European Parliament constituency), former constituency

Other uses

 BBC West Midlands, a local BBC region